Battersea is a historic plantation house in Prairieville, Alabama. The house was built from 1820 to 1845 by the Vaughan family from Petersburg, Virginia and served as an early stagecoach stop.  It was added to the National Register of Historic Places as a historic district on July 7, 1994, as a part of the Plantation Houses of the Alabama Canebrake and Their Associated Outbuildings Multiple Property Submission.

References

Houses on the National Register of Historic Places in Alabama
National Register of Historic Places in Hale County, Alabama
Historic districts in Hale County, Alabama
Houses completed in 1845
Plantation houses in Alabama
Houses in Hale County, Alabama
Historic districts on the National Register of Historic Places in Alabama